Your Favorite MC is a collaborative album by American rapper Reef the Lost Cauze and German production team Snowgoons. It was released on October 25, 2011 on Goon MuSick / iHipHop Distribution.

Track listing

References

External links

2011 albums
Collaborative albums
Reef the Lost Cauze albums